The December 2003 New England snowstorm was a severe nor'easter that impacted the Eastern United States during the first week of the month. It produced heavy snowfall throughout the New England and Mid-Atlantic regions, exceeding  in northern New England. The cyclone had complex origins, involving several individual weather disturbances. An area of low pressure primarily associated with the southern branch of the jet stream spread light precipitation across portions of the Midwest and Southeast. The low reached the coast on December 5 and continued to produce snow throughout the Mid-Atlantic. Another system involving the northern branch of the jet stream merged with the initial storm, causing another coastal storm to develop. This storm soon became the primary feature as it intensified and moved northeastward. It reached Cape Cod on December 6, but became nearly stationary through the morning of December 7. It had finally dissipated by December 8.

As a result of extremely cold temperatures over the region, snowfall accumulations were generally significant and broke several daily records. At Albany, New York,  of snow fell in just one day. Locations affected by the storm commonly picked up , with totals occasionally exceeding .

The event led to widespread travel delays from Washington, D.C. to Boston, and around 13 people died because of the storm. 35.6 of snow inches fell just 14 miles north of Boston in the city of Peabody, Massachusetts. The nor'easter was among the largest early-season winter storms on record to affect the major East Coast cities. Many areas reported blizzard-like conditions.

See also

Climate of the United States
List of New England hurricanes

References

External links
Meteorological description

Nor'easters
2003 meteorology
December 2003 events in North America
2003 in Canada
2003 natural disasters in the United States